Margot Honecker (née Feist; 17 April 1927 – 6 May 2016) was an East German politician who was an influential member of that country's Communist government until 1989. From 1963 until 1989, she was Minister of National Education (Ministerin für Volksbildung) of the GDR. She was married to Erich Honecker, the leader of East Germany's ruling Socialist Unity Party from 1971 to 1989 and concurrently from 1976 to 1989 the country's head of state.

Margot Honecker was widely known as the "Purple Witch" for her tinted hair and hardline Stalinist views, and was described as "the most hated person" in East Germany next to Stasi chief Erich Mielke by former Bundestag president Wolfgang Thierse. She was responsible for the enactment of the "Uniform Socialist Education System" in 1965 and mandatory military training in schools to prepare pupils for a future war with the west. She was alleged to have been responsible for the regime's forced adoption of children of jailed dissidents or people who attempted to desert from the GDR, and she is considered to have "left a cruel legacy of separated families." She also established prison-like institutions for children, including a camp at Torgau known as "Margot's concentration camp." She was one of the few spouses of a ruling Communist Party leader who held significant power in her own right, as her prominence in the regime predated her husband's ascension to the leadership of the SED.

Following the downfall of the communist regime in 1990, Honecker fled to the Soviet Union with her husband to avoid criminal charges from the government of reunified Germany. Fearing extradition to Germany, they took refuge in the Chilean embassy in Moscow in 1991, but in 1992 her husband was extradited to Germany by Yeltsin's Russian government to face criminal trial, and was detained in the Moabit prison. Margot Honecker then fled from Moscow to Chile to avoid a similar fate. At the time of her death, she lived in Chile with her daughter Sonja. 

She left the party in 1990, after her husband's expulsion, and both later became members of the small fringe party Communist Party of Germany, which is considered extremist by the German authorities. Formed in East Berlin in January 1990, the party claims to be the direct successor of the historical party formed in 1918 and is known for its support for North Korea's government; however, it operates only in the territory of the former East Germany.

Early life
Honecker was born Margot Feist in Halle on 17 April 1927, the daughter of a shoemaker, Gotthard Feist (1906–1993), and a factory worker, Helene Feist ( 1906–1940). Her parents were members of Communist Party of Germany (KPD). Her father was imprisoned in Lichtenburg concentration camp in the 1930s and from 1937 until 1939 in Buchenwald concentration camp. Gestapo agents searched their apartment for evidence of subversive activities on several occasions. After graduating from elementary school, she was a member of the Nazi Party's girls' organisation Bund Deutscher Mädel from 1938 to 1945, whose membership was obligatory. Her mother died in 1940 when Margot was 13 years old.

Her brother, Manfred Feist, later became the leader of the Foreign Information department within the party's Central Committee.

Party

In 1945 Margot Feist joined the KPD. After April 1946, with the contentious merger of the SPD and KPD, she became a member of East Germany's next ruling party, the Socialist Unity Party (Sozialistische Einheitspartei Deutschlands / SED), working in Halle as a shorthand typist with the FDGB (Trades Union Federation) regional executive for Saxony-Anhalt.

In 1946 she also joined the regional secretariat of the Free German Youth (FDJ)—effectively the youth wing of the ruling party—in Halle. She then began a meteoric rise through its various departments. In 1947 she became the leader of the culture and education department in the FDJ's regional executive and in 1948 secretary of the FDJ's central council as well as chairperson of the Ernst Thälmann Pioneer Organisation.

By 1949 Feist was a member of the GDR's precursor parliament. In 1949 at the age of 22 she was elected as a representative in the newly founded People's Chamber.

Margot Feist met her future husband, Erich Honecker, at FDJ meetings when he was the chairman of the Freie Deutsche Jugend. Honecker was 15 years older and married. The relationship between them nevertheless moved on when Feist in her capacity as leader of the "Ernst Thälmann young pioneers", was a member of the delegation that traveled to Moscow for the celebration of Stalin's official birthday. The East German delegation was led by Erich Honecker. After she became pregnant and gave birth to their daughter Sonja in 1952, Honecker divorced his second wife Edith and married Margot.

Minister of National Education

In 1963 Honecker became Minister of National Education, after a period of occupying the office as Acting Minister. On 25 February 1965 she introduced the law that made "the uniform socialist education system" standard in all schools, colleges and universities throughout East Germany.

For her work as Minister of National Education, she was awarded the Order of Karl Marx, the nation's highest award, in 1977.

In 1978 Honecker introduced, against the opposition of the churches and many parents, military lessons for 9th and 10th grade high school students (this included training on weapons such as aerial guns and the KK-MPi). Her tenure lasted until early November 1989.

She was, allegedly but never proven, responsible for the regime's kidnapping and forced adoption of children of jailed dissidents or people who attempted to desert from GDR, and she is considered to have "left a cruel legacy of separated families." Margot dismissed the allegations that she had directed a program of forced adoptions: "It didn’t exist". She also established prison-like institutions for children, including a camp at Torgau known as "Margot's concentration camp."

In 1990, charges were made against Honecker as Minister of Education. These included accusations that she had arranged politically motivated arrests, had separated children against their will from their parents and made compulsory adoptions of children from persons deemed unreliable by the state.

Loss of power

Throughout the Peaceful Revolution of 1989 Honecker briefly remained in office after her husband's ousting as leader of the Socialist Unity Party in October 1989, but was sacked from cabinet on 2 November. On 4 February 1990 she resigned from the Party of Democratic Socialism, successor of the SED; her husband had been expelled two months earlier. She later joined the newly refounded Communist Party of Germany (KPD).

Flight to Moscow and Chile
A new arrest warrant against Erich Honecker was issued in December 1990, but there was no immediate arrest.  In March 1991, the couple were flown in a Soviet military jet to Moscow from the Sperenberg Airfield near Berlin. As soon as they arrived in Moscow, Margot's husband was taken directly to a Red Army hospital where his cancer was diagnosed. The two of them were then installed in a government dacha and treated as honoured guests, while one by one their Kremlin comrades fell from power. Boris Yeltsin was already busy building up his power base in Moscow, and Erich Honecker's desperate last letter to President Gorbachev went unanswered.   

As the Soviet Union collapsed, and fearing that they might find themselves handed over to the German authorities, in August 1991 the Honeckers took refuge in the Chilean embassy, where for nearly a year they lived out of a suitcase in a small room. 

They hoped to be able to fly directly from Moscow to a Chilean exile, but the German government had other ideas. The Russian leadership refused to become involved: it fell to the German Chancellor, Helmut Kohl, and the Chilean President, Patricio Aylwin, to negotiate a future for the Honeckers. There was public and political pressure in Germany for the East German leadership to be held accountable for the killings of people attempting to escape over the Berlin Wall between 1961 and 1989, while Chile had itself only recently emerged from dictatorship: Margot's own son-in-law was one among several thousand Chilean political dissidents from the Pinochet years who had reason to be grateful to the old East German political establishment that had welcomed them as political exiles during the 1970s and 1980s. 

Formally, the negotiations between Kohl and Aylwin were defined by tensions between the Chilean determination to uphold the Honeckers' right to political asylum and Germany's legal agreements on extradition: for some months the discussions were characterised by mutual intransigence. In the end, on 29 July 1992, Erich Honecker was sent on a special flight to face trial in Berlin, but his wife did not accompany him. Margot Honecker instead flew to Santiago to join her daughter Sonja and her family, who had been living in Chile since 1990.

Post-GDR exile

After 1992, Margot Honecker lived in Santiago, Chile, with her daughter, son-in-law, and grandson: Sonja Honecker de Yáñez, Leo Yáñez Betancourt, and Roberto Yáñez Honecker. 

In January 1993, Erich Honecker's trial in Berlin, which some felt had by that stage already descended into farce, was cut short because of the rapidly deteriorating health of the accused. He left Berlin for the last time on 13 March 1993, bound for Chile. Honecker lived with his wife and daughter, whose own twenty year marriage ended in divorce the year after her parents moved in. 
He died of liver cancer at the age of 81 on 29 May 1994 in Santiago. His body was cremated.

In 1999, Honecker failed in her legal attempt to sue the German government for €60,300 of property confiscated following reunification. In 2001, her appeal to ECtHR failed. She received a survivor's pension and the old-age pension of the German old-age pension insurance federation of about 1,500 euros, which she regarded as insolently sparse.

In 2000, Luis Corvalán, the former General Secretary of the Communist Party of Chile, published the book The Other Germany – the GDR. Discussions with Margot Honecker, in which Honecker speaks about the history of the GDR from her perspective.

On 19 July 2008, on the occasion of the 29th anniversary of the Sandinista revolution in Nicaragua, Honecker was awarded the order for cultural independence "Rubén Dario" from President Daniel Ortega. The award was in recognition of Honecker's untiring support of the national campaign against illiteracy in the 1980s. This honor was Honecker's first public appearance since the fall of the Berlin Wall. Honecker was reported to have said she was grateful for the honor; but said nothing publicly. The left-wing heads of state of Paraguay and Venezuela, Fernando Lugo and Hugo Chávez, also took part in the celebrations in Managua.

To the day she died, Honecker continued to defend the old East Germany and identified herself as a hardline Communist. In October 2009, Honecker celebrated the 60th anniversary of the founding of the GDR with former Chilean exiles who had sought asylum in East Germany. She participated in singing a patriotic East German song and gave a short speech in which she stated that East Germans "had a good life in the GDR" and that many felt that capitalism has made their lives worse. In 2011, author Frank Schuhmann published a book entitled Letzte Aufzeichnungen – Für Margot (Final Notes – For Margot in English) based on the 400-page diary kept by Erich Honecker during his stay in Berlin's Moabit prison beginning in July 1992. The diary was given to the author by Margot Honecker.

On 2 April 2012, Honecker gave an interview where she defended the GDR, attacked those who helped to "destroy" it, and complained about her pension. She felt that there was no need for people to climb over the Berlin Wall and lose their lives. She suggested that the GDR was a good country and that the demonstrations were driven by the GDR's enemies. "The GDR also had its foes. That's why we had the Stasi," she said.

In a 2012 interview with Das Erste she labelled Mikhail Gorbachev a "traitor" for his reforms and called the defectors of East Germany "criminals and terrorists." She said that the Federal Republic of Germany, the European Union, and the United States will collapse. She also said that she supports Russian president Vladimir Putin.

Death

Margot Honecker died in Santiago on 6 May 2016, at the age of 89. On her death the historian Hubertus Knabe, director of the Berlin-Hohenschönhausen Memorial, said that "she never critically reflected on what she had done. Up until her death she was an evil, unrepentant woman." Her funeral was described by German media as "bizarre" and featuring 50 "diehard" communists with East German flags. Victims associations and Roland Jahn, Federal Commissioner for the Stasi Records, criticised the funeral.

In popular culture
Honecker is a recurring antagonist in the 2022 German Netflix spy thriller Kleo. She is played by Steffi Kühnert.

Gallery

Notes

References

Further reading

 
 
 
 
 
 

1927 births
2016 deaths
People from Halle (Saale)
People from the Province of Saxony
Communist Party of Germany politicians
Members of the Central Committee of the Socialist Unity Party of Germany
Government ministers of East Germany
Members of the Provisional Volkskammer
Members of the 1st Volkskammer
Members of the 5th Volkskammer
Members of the 6th Volkskammer
Members of the 7th Volkskammer
Members of the 8th Volkskammer
Members of the 9th Volkskammer
Free German Youth members
First ladies of East Germany
Spouses of German politicians
Women government ministers of East Germany
Female members of the Volkskammer
People granted political asylum in the Soviet Union
Article 1 of Protocol No. 1 of the European Convention on Human Rights
European Court of Human Rights cases involving Germany
German expatriates in Chile
Recipients of the Patriotic Order of Merit in gold